Richard Barrey (died 1588), of the Moat, Sevington and Dover, Kent was an English politician.

He was a Member of Parliament (MP) for Dover in 1584 and 1586 and for Winchelsea in 1572.

References

16th-century births
1588 deaths
Members of the Parliament of England for Dover
English MPs 1572–1583
English MPs 1584–1585
English MPs 1586–1587